The 1968–69 La Liga was the 38th season since its establishment. The season started on September 14, 1968, and finished on April 20, 1969.

Competition format 
The relegation playoffs were disestablished and the three last qualified teams were directly relegated to Segunda División.

Team locations

League table

Results table

Pichichi Trophy

External links 
  Official LFP Site

1968 1969
1968–69 in Spanish football leagues
Spain